Vanity Fair (大亨) is a Hong Kong television series that debuted on January 2, 1978, on TVB.

Crew
The theme song "Vanity Fair" (大亨) was composed by Joseph Koo and lyricist Wong Jim, arranged by Joseph Koo and Choi Tak Choi, and sung by Paula Tsui.

1978 Hong Kong television series debuts
1978 Hong Kong television series endings
Cantonese-language television shows
TVB dramas